The term Amphenol connector refers to various electronics connectors that are introduced, or made primarily by Amphenol Corp. Depending on the area of electronics concerned, it may refer specifically to:

MIL-DTL-5015 / MIL-C-5015, a circular connector
MIL-DTL-26482 / MIL-C-26482, a circular bayonet connector
RJ21, used in aggregated telecommunications cabling
Micro ribbon, used in personal computer's connection to printer or SCSI equipment
ARINC 828, a repurposing of MIL-DTL-38999.
UHF connector, a threaded RF coaxial connector
A circular connector, usually consisting of 6, 9 or 11 pins, used to connect a Hammond organ to a Leslie speaker.

See also
 MC4 connector
 Solar micro-inverter

References

External links

Electrical connectors